Ludmila Prince (born 2 January 1975 in Riga) is a Latvian former artistic gymnast. She competed at the 1996 Summer Olympics.

References

External links
 

1975 births
Living people
Latvian female artistic gymnasts
Gymnasts at the 1996 Summer Olympics
Olympic gymnasts of Latvia
Sportspeople from Riga
20th-century Latvian women